Bredikhin is a lunar impact crater that is located on the far side of the Moon. It lies just to the west of the crater Mitra, and northeast of Raimond.

This is a worn crater formation with features that have been dusted by material from the ray system of Jackson, about three crater diameters to the northwest. The rim is overlaid by a small crater along the west-northwest, and by a formation of craterlets along the southwest. The most prominent feature within the interior is the crater which overlays much of the northwest floor, including the midpoint.

Bredikhin lies within the Dirichlet-Jackson Basin.

Satellite craters 

By convention these features are identified on lunar maps by placing the letter on the side of the crater midpoint that is closest to Bredikhin.

See also 
 Asteroid 786 Bredichina

References

External links
 

Impact craters on the Moon